Watong is a village near Hawai, India town Anjaw district of Arunachal Pradesh.

References

Anjaw district
Villages in Anjaw district